American Ride is an American historical documentary series produced by BYUtv and hosted by motorcycle-riding host Stan Ellsworth. From the seat of his Harley Davidson, Ellsworth narrates the series focusing on pivotal events in American history and visits the places where those events unfolded. The show won a regional 2013 Emmy Award for best host.

References

BYU TV original programming
2010s American documentary television series
2011 American television series debuts